Monkey see, monkey do is a pidgin-style saying that was already called an "old saying" in 1900. The saying refers to the learning of a process without an understanding of why it works. Another definition implies the act of imitation, usually with limited knowledge and/or concern for the consequences.

Versions of the saying that appeared in U.S. commercial advertisements for shoes and other apparel in the 1890s suggested it was popularly established by then, and an article in Sharpe's London Magazine half a century earlier had pointed to monkeys' habit of mimicry: "Whatever [a monkey] sees men do, he must affect to do the like himself." The West African folklore tale of a peddler whose wares are ransacked by monkeys that proceed to imitate his gestures of outrage has been retold by Esphyr Slobodkina in Caps for Sale (A Tale of a Peddler, Some Monkeys and Their Monkey Business) and by Baba Wagué Diakité in The Hatseller and the Monkeys. Diakité notes that versions of his tale also are found in Egypt, Sudan, India, and England, and indeed have existed in Europe since the Middle Ages.

Jazz singer-songwriter Michael Franks used the saying as the subject and title of his song "Monkey See – Monkey Do" on his 1976 album "The Art of Tea". A television show of the same name aired on PBS Kids Sprout from 2010 to 2013 and later on Qubo and was produced by Title Entertainment and Smartoonz, the company also behind Sprout's Nina's Little Fables. The phrase is also mentioned in Nirvana's song "Stay Away" from their album Nevermind.

This same saying was used by Terence Trent D'Arby in the song "Wishing Well" and by Beth Orton in her Song  "Galaxy of Emptiness".

The phrase is also pastiched (imitated) in Planet of the Apes (1968), inverted into "Human see, human do".

See also 

 Cargo cult science
 Echolalia
 Hypercorrection
 Imitation
 Mimic octopus
 Mirror neurons in monkeys
 Three wise monkeys

References 

Adages
Metaphors referring to monkeys
1920s neologisms
Quotations
Fictional monkeys